Zhengzhou Metro is a rapid transit rail network serving urban and suburban districts of Zhengzhou, the capital city of Henan province. It is operated by the state owned Zhengzhou Metro Group. Opened on 28 December 2013, it is the first metro system in Henan province, and 18th in mainland China.

History

"Project 7401"
The history of the metro network in Zhengzhou dates back to 1974, when the first metro project in Zhengzhou was planned. It was called as the "Project 7401", since it was the first project approved by the CPC Henan Provincial Committee in 1974. The project was designed for both civilian and military use, as a single track metro line in peacetime, and could be used for civil defense during war. The first phase was planned to start at Huayuan Road (near Zijingshan), then move westward via Erqi Square, and ends at the Cable Factory on Funiu Road, with 6 stations. Part of the planned route was similar to the route of the current Line 1. Construction began in 1975, and stopped in 1980, when the project was finally called off. Some sections of the tunnels and one station in Bishagang (not the current Bishagang station) had been completed then. The completed station was transformed into an underground department store in 1982.

The First Round of Construction
In 2000, the planning of the current Zhengzhou Metro system was started. The plan had been adjusted several times, and was finalized in 2008. The first phase of the system, including Line 1 and Line 2, was approved by National Development and Reform Commission (NDRC) in February 2009.  Construction of Line 1 started on 6 June 2009 and Line 2 started construction on 28 December 2010.  As planned, Line 1 and Line 2 commenced operations on 26 December 2013 and 19 August 2016 respectively. On January 12, 2017, Chengjiao line started operation. It is in through services with Line 2 and allows the system to serve the Zhengzhou Xinzheng International Airport.

The Second Round of Construction 
In April 2014, the NDRC published the Construction Plan of Zhengzhou Rapid Transit System (2014-2020), marking the start of the second round of construction. The second phase of Line 1 was put into use on 12 January 2017, Line 5 opened on 20 May 2019. Line 2 Phase II opened on 28 December 2019. Line 3 and Line 4 opened on 26 December 2020.

The Third Round of Construction 
In April 2019, the NDRC approved the Phase III Construction Plan of Zhengzhou Rapid Transit System (2019-2024), marking the start of the third round of construction. Line 10 and Line 14 are already under construction. Line 14 was opened on 19 September 2019.

Accidents and incidents
 On 22 February 2013, four workers were buried at the construction site of Tongbailu station (current Wuyigongyuan station) due to collapse. Two of them were killed and the other two injured.
 On 31 July 2018, 12 workers at the construction site of Zhengzhou People's Hospital station on Line 5 were sent to hospital for feeling headache and nausea caused by lack of oxygen.

July 2021 floods 

Beginning on July 17, 2021, heavy rains occurred in Henan. The rainfall in Zhengzhou from 20:20 on July 17 to 20:20 on July 20 reached , of which the rainfall within an hour from 16:00 to 17:00 on July 20 reached . It broke through historical records, far exceeding the "24-hour rainfall exceeding " extreme rainstorm level designated by the National Meteorological Center.

On July 20, many stations of Zhengzhou Metro were flooded with heavy water, which caused serious water accumulation. A landslide accident occurred at a construction site of Longzihu West station of Line 12 in the morning, but no casualties were caused.

At about 18:00 on July 20, rainwater entered the tunnel between Haitansi station and Shakoulu station of Line 5. A train was trapped in the tunnel and water entered. The water level in the car once reached the chest position, and the passengers stranded in the car were trapped for several hours, until they were rescued and left the carriage. The floods in Zhengzhou Metro killed 14 people.

Zhengzhou Metro closed several stations, and then announced the suspension of operation of the whole metro network at 18:00 on July 20.

Line 1, Line 2 (Liuzhuang to Nansihuan section) and Chengjiao line reopened on September 12. Line 2 (Jiahe to Liuzhuang section), Line 3, Line 4 and Line 5 reopened on September 15. Due to equipment replacement, Line 14 reopened later on 29 August 2022.

Lines in operation

Line 1

This line connects many important places or areas of the city, including Zhengzhou University, Zhengzhou railway station, Zhengdong New Area, Zhengzhou East railway station and the Longzihu College Area. CSR Zhuzhou supplied six-car Type B metro trains for Line 1 under a contract signed in January 2011. On 12 January 2017, both east and west extensions of the line opened, adding  and 9 stations to the line. The color for Line 1 is red.

Line 2

The second phase (north extension, from Liuzhuang to Jiahe) was opened on 28 December 2019. According to future plan, the southern terminus of Line 2 will be , which is currently operated as a station on Chengjiao line, after the completion of Line 9. The color for Line 2 is yellow.

Line 3

Line 3, began operation on 26 December 2020, is a northwest–southeast line. The color for Line 3 is orange.

Line 4

Line 4, began operation on 26 December 2020, is a northwest–southeast line. The color for Line 4 is light blue.

Line 5

It runs mainly under Huanghe Road, Shangwu Outer Ring Road, Xinyi Road, Hanghai Road, Tongbai Road and Xizhan Road, forming a loop around the city center. Line 5 opened on 20 May 2019. An infill station, Jingbeierlu station opened on 15 May 2021. It is also the first metro line in Zhengzhou to use Type A metro trains, which were manufactured by CRRC Zhuzhou Locomotive. The color for Line 5 is green.

Line 6

Line 6, began operation on 30 September 2022, is a west–east line. The color for Line 6 is purple.

Line 14

Line 14 was opened on 19 September 2019. The color for Line 14 is light purple.

Chengjiao line

This line was opened on January 12, 2017. The line connects the city with Longhu Town, Zhengzhou Airport Economy Zone and Zhengzhou Xinzheng International Airport. Trains on this line are currently in through operation with Line 2.

Chengjiao line has the same yellow color as Line 2 on the signs, although the system map on Zhengzhou Metro's website shows this line with the color of olive, which is the color for Line 9. According to the plan, Chengjiao line will be operated as a part of Line 9 in the future.

Future lines
Note: The names of the stations in the following tables are proposed names and future changes are highly possible.

Lines under construction
Currently, 6 lines are under construction, including Line 6 (Phase I), Line 7 (Phase 1), Line 8 (Phase 1), Line 10 (Phase I), Line 12 (Phase 1), Zhengxu line (also known as Line 17).

Fares and tickets
Fares of Zhengzhou Metro are calculated by distance traveled, ranging from ¥2 (within ) to ¥9 (the longest journeys within the current system). A journey shorter than  costs ¥2; ¥1 is charged for every  after , every  after , and every  after . The system is free of charge for elderly citizens in Zhengzhou with ages above 60 during non-peak hours and on public holidays. Children under the height of  may ride for free when accompanied by an adult. There are also student fares, which are half the adult fare, for full-time students enrolled in primary or middle schools.

Single journey ticket
Single journey tickets can be bought on the ticket vending machines at every station. The passenger has to tap it on the sensor on the ticket gate when entering and insert it into a slot at the exit gate where the ticket is reclaimed. From 1 June 2016, passengers can buy single journey tickets with WeChat or Alipay in advance and collect the tickets at stations.

In September 2017, the "Cloud Gate" service was launched, which allows passengers to enter and exit with barcodes generated with AliPay on smartphones.

Lü Cheng Tong
Lü Cheng Tong (literally: "Green City Pass") is a rechargeable contactless smart card which can be used on the metro and buses in Zhengzhou with discounts. A 5% discount is offered for taking Zhengzhou Metro using Lü Cheng Tong compared to using single journey tickets.

Rolling stock

Line 1
 CRRC Zhuzhou Type B 6-car sets
 CRRC Qingdao Sifang Type B 6-car sets

Line 2 and Chengjiao Line
 CRRC Zhuzhou Type B 6-car sets
 CRRC Qingdao Sifang Type B 6-car sets

Line 5
 CRRC Zhuzhou Type A 6-car sets

Network Map

See also
 Urban rail transit in China
 List of Metro systems

References

External links

 Official website
 UrbanRail.Net – descriptions of all metro systems in the world, each with a schematic map showing all stations.

 
Rapid transit in China
Transport in Zhengzhou
Transport in Henan
Railway lines opened in 2013
2013 establishments in China